Anthony Lanier II (born May 8, 1993) is an American football defensive end for the Saskatchewan Roughriders of the Canadian Football League (CFL). He played college football at Alabama A&M and was signed by the Washington Redskins as an undrafted free agent in 2016.

Professional career

Washington Redskins
After going unselected in the 2016 NFL Draft, Lanier signed with the Washington Redskins on May 6, 2016. Standing out in training camp and the preseason, the team announced he made the 53-man roster on September 3, 2016. In his NFL debut in Week 8, Lanier recovered a fumble forced by Chris Baker on Bengals' quarterback Andy Dalton. He was placed on injured reserve on December 13, 2016.

Lanier was inactive for the first six games of 2017. In Week 11 against the New Orleans Saints, he recorded first career sack on Drew Brees. He would have a breakout performance in Week 15 against the Arizona Cardinals recording two sacks, three pass deflections, and a forced fumble. On September 3, 2018, the Redskins waived/injured Lanier. He went unclaimed in the waiver stage, and reverted to the team's injured reserve list before being waived with an injury settlement on September 8.

Los Angeles Chargers
On November 7, 2018, Lanier was signed to the Los Angeles Chargers practice squad. He was promoted to the active roster on December 20, 2018.

On August 31, 2019, Lanier was waived by the Chargers and signed to the practice squad the next day. His practice squad contract with the team expired on January 6, 2020.

Kansas City Chiefs
On January 8, 2020, Lanier signed a reserve/future contract with the Kansas City Chiefs. He was waived on April 28, 2020.

Lanier had a tryout with the Detroit Lions on August 19, 2020.

New Orleans Saints 
Lanier was signed by the New Orleans Saints on August 29, 2020. He was placed on injured reserve on September 5, 2020, and waived with an injury settlement on September 11.

Saskatchewan Roughriders
Lanier signed with the Saskatchewan Roughriders of the CFL on March 2, 2021.

References

External links
 Alabama A&M Bulldogs bio

1993 births
African-American players of American football
Alabama A&M Bulldogs basketball players
Alabama A&M Bulldogs football players
American football defensive ends
American football defensive tackles
Basketball players from Savannah, Georgia
Kansas City Chiefs players
New Orleans Saints players
Living people
Los Angeles Chargers players
Players of American football from Savannah, Georgia
Saskatchewan Roughriders players
Washington Redskins players
21st-century African-American sportspeople